Årstein is the administrative centre of Gratangen Municipality in Troms og Finnmark county, Norway. The village is located on the north side of the Gratangsfjorden at the narrowest point along the fjord. The Årstein Bridge crosses the fjord here.

The Årstein area has 211 inhabitants (as of 2010), making it the largest urbanized area in the municipality.  Gratangen Church is located in the village.

References 

Gratangen
Villages in Troms